DX2 may refer to:

 Pretty Cure All Stars DX2: Light of Hope - Protect the Rainbow Jewel!, a 2010 anime film
 (5347) 1985 DX2, a main-belt minor planet
 Intel DX2, a CPU produced by Intel
 Deus Ex: Invisible War, a 2003 role-playing video game
 Shin Megami Tensei: Liberation Dx2, a 2018 mobile role-playing game

See also
 DX (disambiguation)